"Addiction Rare in Patients Treated with Narcotics" is the title of a letter to the editor written by Jane Porter and Hershel Jick and published in the January 10, 1980, issue of The New England Journal of Medicine. The letter analyzed data on patients who had been treated with opioids in a hospital setting, and concluded that addiction was uncommon among such patients. It has since been frequently misrepresented to claim that opioids are not addictive when prescribed for use at home, which has been blamed for contributing to the opioid epidemic in the United States.

Content
The letter reported on an examination of medical files of patients who had been hospitalized and treated with small doses of opioids. The authors concluded that of the 11,882 patients who received at least one narcotic drug, only four of them had developed a "reasonably well documented" addiction among patients who had no history of addiction. Its text read, in its entirety:

Influence
The article has been cited extensively as evidence that addiction was very rare among patients who were prescribed narcotics (more specifically, opioids). It became so well known that it is sometimes referred to simply as Porter and Jick.

Methodological limitations
Methodological limitations from which the letter suffered included that the patients it reported on were all given opioids in small doses in a hospital. Additionally, in 2003, Jick told The New York Times that the study did not follow patients after they left the hospital.

Misrepresentation
In 2017, the letter attracted renewed interest because the New England Journal of Medicine published a bibliographic analysis of the letter showing that it had been cited 608 times since it was published. In comparison, the other letters to the editor in the same issue of the Journal as Porter and Jick's letter had been cited a median of 11 times. Of these 608 citations, the analysis also showed that 72.2% of them cited it in support of the claim that patients treated with opioids rarely developed addiction, and 80.8% did not mention that the letter only included data on prescriptions given to hospitalized patients. It was also misrepresented in the popular media; a 1990 Scientific American article described it as an "extensive study," and a 2001 Time story dubbed it a "landmark study" showing that concerns about opioid addiction were "basically unwarranted." In addition, Purdue Pharma, the manufacturer of OxyContin, trained its sales representatives to say that the risk of addiction among patients using the drug was less than 1 percent, citing Porter and Jick's letter as one of their sources.

Role in the opioid epidemic
Because the letter has been frequently misrepresented to argue that opioids were rarely addictive, these misrepresentations have been blamed for contributing to the opioid epidemic. For example, a co-author of the 2017 bibliographic analysis, David Juurlink, has stated that he thinks the letter's appearance in a prestigious journal helped convince doctors that opioids were safe, saying, "I think it's fair to say that this letter went quite a long way." Jick, who wrote the letter, has since said that "The letter wasn't of value to health and medicine in and of itself. So if I could take it back—if I knew then what I know now, I would never have published it. It wasn't worth it."

References

External links
 Original letter

Academic journal articles
1980 documents
Pain management
Opioids
Letters (message)
Clinical pharmacology
Evidence-based medicine